Unione Calcio Sampdoria finished ninth in Serie A, despite the absence of club stalwart Roberto Mancini, who had followed coach Sven-Göran Eriksson to Lazio. Former Argentine World Cup-winning coach César Luis Menotti took charge, but failed to match the results of Eriksson, and was replaced by the 1991 championship winning coach Vujadin Boškov, who guided the team to a safe mid-table slot.

Players

Goalkeepers
  Fabrizio Ferron
  Marco Ambrosio
  Giovanni Sanino

Defenders
  David Balleri
  Hugo
  Moreno Mannini
  Marcello Castellini
  Emanuele Pesaresi
  Siniša Mihajlović
  Alessandro Lamonica
  Oumar Dieng
  Stefano Nava

Midfielders
  Marco Franceschetti
  Pierre Laigle
  Ángel Morales
  Alain Boghossian
  Fausto Salsano
  Christian Karembeu
  Simone Vergassola
  Juan Sebastián Verón
  Alessio Scarchilli
  Nicola Zanini

Forwards
  Vincenzo Montella
  Sandro Tovalieri
  Jürgen Klinsmann
  Daniele Dichio
  Paco Soares
  Giuseppe Signori
  François Omam-Biyik

Competitions

Serie A

League table

Matches

Coppa Italia

Statistics

Goalscorers
  Vincenzo Montella 20
  Alain Boghossian 6
  Pierre Laigle 5
  Siniša Mihajlović 3
  Sandro Tovalieri 3

References

U.C. Sampdoria seasons
Sampdoria